The 1st Kuwaiti Federation Cup was held between January 1, 2008 and February 5, 2008.

The First Federation Cup was one of four competitions in the Kuwaiti 2007/2008 season, all 14 clubs participated in the championship. They were divided into two groups of seven, and the winner and runner-up of each group advanced to the semi-finals.

Al Qadsia won this season's Federation Cup after overcoming Al Kuwait 4-3 in penalties.

Group A

Group B

Semi-finals

All times given as local time (UTC+3)

Third place play-off

Final

Top scorers

References

External links
goalzz.com - Kuwaiti Federation Cup

2008
Kuwait Federation Cup, 2008
2007–08 in Kuwaiti football